Perse may refer to:

 Persa (play), a comedy by the Roman playwright Plautus
 Perse (mythology) (also Persa or Perseis), an Oceanid and consort of Helios in Greek mythology
 The Perse School, an independent co-educational school in Cambridge, England
 Stephen Perse Foundation, a family of independent schools in Cambridge and Saffron Walden, England
 Stephen Perse, the founder of The Perse School
 Saint-John Perse, a French diplomat and poet
 Broderie perse, a sewing technique
 Perse, a genus of fossil snails in the family Fasciolariidae
 Virachola perse, a species of butterfly
 A river and a waterfall in Koknese manor park, Aizkraukle District, Latvia
 Pērse, a tributary to Daugava River

See also
 
 
 Finnish profanity
 Persée
 Persse (disambiguation)
 Persia (disambiguation)
 Pers (disambiguation)
 Purse (disambiguation)
 Percy (disambiguation)
 per se (disambiguation)